William Monroe High School is a high school in Stanardsville, Virginia. The current principal is Katie Brunelle.

History 
William Monroe High School serves as the only public secondary school in Greene County. The school's namesake, William Monroe, immigrated to this area from Great Britain in 1749. His will provided that the interest from his estate be used for the free education of the area youth. When Greene County was formed from Orange County in 1838, the Greene Humane Society was incorporated to administer the portion of the fund that was allotted to the county.

William Monroe High School was opened in 1925 as a one-story frame building with eight classrooms surrounding an auditorium. In 1934, two additional classrooms were built onto the rear of the building. Four of the high school classrooms were used for elementary students until William Monroe Elementary School was opened during the 1954-1955 school year.

In accordance with the will of the voters of Greene County in 1961, a new William Monroe High School was opened in 1962. This building contained 15 classrooms on two parallel wings, a gymnasium/auditorium/cafeteria, and offices for guidance and administration. An addition of 4 classrooms and a library was built in 1970, and in 1982 a cafeteria was added which provided seating for 200 students. The next year, 1983, the school was expanded to include a new gymnasium with a seating capacity of 1200, coach's offices, and an extra classroom. In 1986 renovations occurred at the Greene County Technical Education Center raising it to a contemporary state-of-the-art building.

Further renovations and additions to the main building were completed in January 1987. This expansion included a modern auditorium, dressing rooms, performing music classroom, two computer labs, five classrooms, and teacher offices, bringing the total classroom number to 33.

In the fall of 1992, William Monroe Middle School was opened at the renovated site of William Monroe Elementary. The eighth grade class was moved to William Monroe Middle School to give the high school the present 9-12 configuration.

In the summer of 1995, old sections of the building were renovated and nine new classrooms and a large workroom were added to create a new Science Wing. Since then, there have been eleven classrooms (mobile units) added adjacent to the Math/Science Wing.

An alternative education program was started on March 1, 2000. It was housed in Trailer 13. As of 2001, by the approval of the School Board, this program was developed into a charter school called the New Directions Academy. The physical facility doubled in size and has a full-time director, three teachers and two secretarial assistants. The New Directions Academy continues to serve students from the middle school through the high school, but no longer is a charter school.

A building addition was approved in the spring of 2005 and a new 18-classroom wing running parallel to the Math/Science wing was opened in late 2006.

References

External links
Monroe High School Home Page

Educational institutions established in 1925
Schools in Greene County, Virginia
Public high schools in Virginia